Han Woo Park is a Korean academic and professor at the Department of Media and Communications, Yeungnam University. He is one of South Korea's most highly cited social science scholars. He is recognized as a pioneer in Webometrics and an expert on Internet activism in South Korea. His research mainly focuses on online media and biggish data in academic, governmental, and business communications. He is currently Editor in Chief of Quality & Quantity and the Journal of Contemporary Eastern Asia.

References 

South Korean academics

Year of birth missing (living people)
Living people